Linda M. Valentino (born 1956) is an American politician from Maine. Valentino is a Democratic State Senator from Maine's 5th District, representing part of York County, including her residence of Saco. She was first elected to the Maine House of Representatives in 2004 and re-elected in 2006, 2008 and 2010. Unable to run for re-election to the Maine House in 2012 due to term limits, Valentino ran in the Democratic primary for the open District 5 State Senate seat to replace fellow Democrat Barry Hobbins. Valentino won the nomination by beating fellow State Representative Donald Pilon. Valentino easily won the general election, defeating Timothy Sevigny. In December 2012, Valentino was named Chair of the Judiciary Committee.

Personal
Valentino was born in 1956 in Maine. She is married to Curtis Scamman and has 3 children. She first entered politics in 1979 when she was elected to the Saco City Council. She served on the Council until 1985, including a stint as deputy mayor. She graduated from the University of Southern Maine in 1976 with an Associate of Arts in Business Administration and a Bachelor of Arts from USM in 2004.

References

1956 births
Living people
University of Southern Maine alumni
Maine city council members
Democratic Party members of the Maine House of Representatives
Democratic Party Maine state senators
People from Saco, Maine
Women state legislators in Maine
Women city councillors in Maine
21st-century American politicians
21st-century American women politicians